Elizabeth "Els" Veder-Smit (29 August 1921 – 26 August 2020) was a Dutch politician of the People's Party for Freedom and Democracy (VVD) and nonprofit director. She was both the Oldest living former cabinet member since the death of Johan Witteveen on 23 April 2019 and the Oldest living former member of the States General since the death of Bart Hofman on 2 May 2019.

Veder-Smit was alderman of Zeist from 1958 to 1962, and municipal councillor of Leeuwarden from 1962 to 1966.

Decorations

References

External links

Official
  Mr. E. (Els) Veder-Smit Parlement.com
  Mr. E. Veder-Smit (VVD) Eerste Kamer der Staten-Generaal

1921 births
2020 deaths
Aldermen in Utrecht (province)
People from Zeist
Dutch nonprofit directors
Knights of the Order of the Netherlands Lion
Members of the House of Representatives (Netherlands)
Members of the Senate (Netherlands)
Municipal councillors of Leeuwarden
Municipal councillors of Zeist
People from Nieuw-Lekkerland
People's Party for Freedom and Democracy politicians
State Secretaries for Health of the Netherlands
Utrecht University alumni
20th-century Dutch women politicians
20th-century Dutch politicians